Founded in 1990, the Center for Curatorial Studies, Bard College (CCS Bard) is an exhibition and research center dedicated to the study of art and exhibition practices from the 1960s to the present. The Center initiated its graduate program in 1994 and is one of the oldest institutions in curatorial pedagogy, offering a two-year graduate-degree program in curating. Hundreds of curators, writers, critics, artists, and scholars taught seminars and lectured in practicums. The Center alumni/ae include more than 200 individuals working in contemporary art field in the U.S. and internationally.

History 
The CCS graduate program is one of eight graduate programs at Bard College in Annandale-on-Hudson, New York. Since its inception in 1994, the graduate program has awarded M.A. degrees to more than 275 students.

The Center's original  facility, designed by architect Jim Goettsch and design consultant Nada Andric, was completed in December 1991. Expanded in 2006, the Center now features the Hessel Museum of Art, a  exhibition space dedicated to the Marieluise Hessel Collection of over 1,700 works of contemporary art. The building also includes a library, classrooms, and a student lounge where CCS graduate students can meet informally about exhibitions and class projects.

Library and Archives 
Serving as the Director of the Library and Archives, Ann Butler has been instrumental in building the Library & Archives at the CCS Bard. The Library consists of over 30,000 volumes focusing on post-1960s contemporary art and curatorial practices. The collection contains international exhibition catalogues, artists' monographs, and international art journals and periodicals. The Special Collections feature historic artist-produced periodicals, a collection of limited edition, signed, and out of print exhibition catalogues, a media collection, and a collection of artists' books. The Archives comprise the institutional archives of CCS Bard and the Hessel Museum of Art, the archives of select galleries, artist-run spaces, the personal papers of select curators and artists, as well as a collection of artist files for artists represented in the Hessel Museum Collection.

Directors 
The current executive director Tom Eccles joined CCS Bard in 2005, built the Hessel Museum of Art, and organized the inaugural exhibition of the Marieluise Hessel Collection, entitled Wrestle (2006). In an interview with Althea Viafora-Kress, Eccles states, "We have two central issues that we deal with: one is that we’re at Bard. We’re not in the center of the city, so people have to have a reason to come here. And the second is that we’re a school. So we try things that might not be able to be done in other places."

Vasif Kortun was the first Director of the Museum of the Center for Curatorial Studies (1994–97). Directors of the Graduate Program have included Associate Professor of Philosophy and Art History Norton Batkin (1991–2008), curators Maria Lind (2008–2010), Johanna Burton (2010–2012), Paul O'Neill (2013–2017), and Lauren Cornell (2017–ongoing).

For the first time in the program's history, Cornell is the director of the graduate program and also the chief curator of the Hessel Museum of Art. Her position includes curriculum and faculty development, directing research initiatives, and overseeing artist- and curator-in-residence programs. In 2016, Cornell co-curated Invisible Adversaries with Tom Eccles in 2016. This exhibition is the 10th anniversary exhibition of the Hessel Collection.

Notable alumni 

 Cecilia Alemani
 Cecilia Brunson
 Candice Hopkins
 C. Davida Ingram
 Inés Katzenstein
 Chus Martínez
 Gabi Ngcobo
 Victoria Noorthoorn
 Carina Plath
 Tomáš Pospiszyl
 Ben Portis
 Laurel Ptak
 Yasmil Raymond

References

External links
 CCS Bard - Center for Curatorial Studies

Bard College
Art museums established in 1991
Educational institutions established in 1990
Museums in Dutchess County, New York
Art museums and galleries in New York (state)
Contemporary art galleries in the United States
University art museums and galleries in New York (state)
University museums in New York (state)
Annandale-on-Hudson, New York
1990 establishments in New York (state)